Arthur William Bunch (30 September 1909 – 1973) was a football player who played as an inside right for Aldershot in the Football League. He also played for Wellington Works and Blyth Spartans.

References

1909 births
1973 deaths
Sportspeople from Bloemfontein
South African soccer players
Aldershot F.C. players
Blyth Spartans A.F.C. players
English Football League players
Association football inside forwards
Soccer players from the Free State (province)